Dowling Creek may refer to:

Dowling Creek (British Columbia), Canada
Dowling Creek (Missouri), United States